The 1990–91 Kansas Jayhawks men's basketball team represented the University of Kansas in the 1990–91 NCAA Division I men's basketball season, which was the Jayhawks' 93rd basketball season. The head coach was Roy Williams, who served his 3rd year at KU. The team played its home games in Allen Fieldhouse in Lawrence, Kansas.

Roster

Big Eight Conference standings

Schedule 

|-

|-

|-
!colspan=9| Big Eight Tournament

|-
!colspan=9| NCAA tournament

Rankings 

*There was no coaches poll in week 1.

References 

Kansas Jayhawks men's basketball seasons
Kansas
NCAA Division I men's basketball tournament Final Four seasons
Kansas
Jay
Jay